Bye bye beauté is an album by Coralie Clément, released in 2005.

Track listing
"Indécise" – 2:42
"Gloria" – 2:37
"L'enfer" – 3:15
"Avec ou sans moi" – 2:09
"Un beau jour pour mourir" – 3:57
"Beau fixe" – 2:41
"Kids (Jeu du foulard)" – 3:05
"L'impasse" – 3:24
"Mais pourtant" (en duo avec Daniel Lorca) – 2:51
"Ta révérence" – 2:49
"Bye bye beauté" – 3:51
"Épilogue" – 3:49

2005 albums